Admiral Horn may refer to:

Gregory C. Horn (born 1953), U.S. Navy rear admiral
Henrik Horn (1618–1693), Swedish admiral 
Klas Horn (1517–1566), Finnish-born Swedish admiral
Pantelis Horn (1881–1941), Hellenic Coast Guard rear admiral

See also
Frederick J. Horne (1880–1959), U.S. Navy admiral